Stephen Lydell Smitherman (born September 1, 1978) is a former Major League Baseball left fielder who played for the Cincinnati Reds in .

External links

1978 births
Living people
Baseball players from Oklahoma
Major League Baseball left fielders
Cincinnati Reds players
Billings Mustangs players
Dayton Dragons players
Stockton Ports players
Chattanooga Lookouts players
Louisville Bats players
Mobile BayBears players
Little Rock Trojans baseball players